Brunauer–Emmett–Teller (BET) theory aims to explain the physical adsorption of gas molecules on a solid surface and serves as the basis for an important analysis technique for the measurement of the specific surface area of materials.  The observations are very often referred to as physical adsorption or physisorption.  In 1938, Stephen Brunauer, Paul Hugh Emmett, and Edward Teller presented their theory in the Journal of the American Chemical Society. BET theory applies to systems of multilayer adsorption that usually utilizes a probing gas (called the adsorbate) that do not react chemically with the adsorptive (the material upon which the gas attaches to and the gas phase is called the adsorptive) to quantify specific surface area. Nitrogen is the most commonly employed gaseous adsorbate for probing surface(s). For this reason, standard BET analysis is most often conducted at the boiling temperature of N2 (77 K). Other probing adsorbates are also utilized, albeit less often, allowing the measurement of surface area at different temperatures and measurement scales. These include argon, carbon dioxide, and water. Specific surface area is a scale-dependent property, with no single true value of specific surface area definable, and thus quantities of specific surface area determined through BET theory may depend on the adsorbate molecule utilized and its adsorption cross section.

Concept

The concept of the theory is an extension of the Langmuir theory, which is a theory for monolayer molecular adsorption, to multilayer adsorption with the following hypotheses:
 gas molecules physically adsorb on a solid in layers infinitely;
 gas molecules only interact with adjacent layers; and
 the Langmuir theory can be applied to each layer.
 the enthalpy of adsorption for the first layer is constant and greater than the second (and higher).
 the enthalpy of adsorption for the second (and higher) layers is the same as the enthalpy of liquefaction. 
The resulting BET equation is

where c is referred to as the BET C-constant, is the vapor pressure of the adsorptive bulk liquid phase which would be at the temperature of the adsorbate and θ is the "surface coverage, defined as:

.

The  is the entire amount that would be present as a monolayer (which is theoretically impossible for physical adsorption) would cover the surface with exactly one layer of adsorbate. The above equation is usually rearranged to yield the following equation for the ease of analysis:

This plot is called a BET plot. The value of the slope  and the y-intercept  of the line are used to calculate the monolayer adsorbed gas quantity  and the BET constant . The following equations can be used:

The BET method is widely used in materials science for the calculation of surface areas of solids by physical adsorption of gas molecules.  The total surface area  and the specific surface area  are given by

where  is in units of volume which are also the units of the monolayer volume of the adsorbate gas,
 is the Avogadro number,  the adsorption cross section of the adsorbate,  the molar volume of the adsorbate gas, and  the mass of the solid sample or adsorbent.

Derivation 
The BET theory can be derived similarly to the Langmuir theory, but by considering multilayered gas molecule adsorption, where it is not required for a layer to be completed before an upper layer formation starts. Furthermore, the authors made five assumptions:
 Adsorptions occur only on well-defined sites of the sample surface (one per molecule)
 The only molecular interaction considered is the following one: a molecule can act as a single adsorption site for a molecule of the upper layer.
 The uppermost molecule layer is in equilibrium with the gas phase, i.e. similar molecule adsorption and desorption rates.
 The desorption is a kinetically limited process, i.e. a heat of adsorption must be provided:
 these phenomena are homogeneous, i.e. same heat of adsorption for a given molecule layer.
 it is E1 for the first layer, i.e. the heat of adsorption at the solid sample surface
 the other layers are assumed similar and can be represented as condensed species, i.e. liquid state. Hence, the heat of adsorption is EL is equal to the heat of liquefaction.
 At the saturation pressure, the molecule layer number tends to infinity (i.e. equivalent to the sample being surrounded by a liquid phase)

Consider a given amount of solid sample in a controlled atmosphere. Let θi be the fractional coverage of the sample surface covered by a number i of successive molecule layers. Let us assume that the adsorption rate Rads,i-1 for molecules on a layer (i-1) (i.e. formation of a layer i) is proportional to both its fractional surface θi-1 and to the pressure P, and that the desorption rate Rdes,i on a layer i is also proportional to its fractional surface θi:

where ki and k−i are the kinetic constants (depending on the temperature) for the adsorption on the layer (i−1) and desorption on layer i, respectively. For the adsorptions, these constant are assumed similar whatever the surface.
Assuming an Arrhenius law for desorption, the related constants can be expressed as

where Ei is the heat of adsorption, equal to E1 at the sample surface and to EL otherwise.

Finding the linear BET range 

It is still not clear on how to find the linear range of the BET plot for microporous materials in a way that reduces any subjectivity in the assessment of the monolayer capacity. A crowd-sourced study involving 61 research groups has shown that reproducibility of BET area determination from identical isotherms is, in some cases, problematic. Rouquerol et al. suggested a procedure that is based on two criteria:
 C must be positive implying that any negative intercept on the BET plot indicates that one is outside the valid range of the BET equation.
 Application of the BET equation must be limited to the range where the term V(1-P/P0) continuously increases with P/P0.
These corrections are an attempt to salvage the BET theory which is restricted to type II isotherm. Even this restriction has to be modified depending upon conditions. The problems with the BET theory are multiple and reviewed by Sing. A serious problem is that there is no relationship between the BET and the calorimetric measurements in experiments. It violates the Gibbs' phase rules. It is extremely unlikely that it measure correctly the surface area, formerly great advantage of the theory. It is based upon chemical equilibrium, which assumes localized chemical bond (this approach has been abandoned by the modern theories. See  chapter 4, χ/ESW and Chapter 7, DFT or better NLDFT) in total contradiction to what is known about physical adsorption, which is based upon non-local intermolecular attractions. Two extreme problems is that in certain cases BET leads to anomalies and the C constant can be negative, implying an imaginary energy.

Applications

Cement and concrete 

The rate of curing of concrete depends on the fineness of the cement and of the components used in its manufacture, which may include fly ash, silica fume and other materials, in addition to the calcinated limestone which causes it to harden. Although the Blaine air permeability method is often preferred, due to its simplicity and low cost, the nitrogen BET method is also used.

When hydrated cement hardens, the calcium silicate hydrate (or C-S-H), which is responsible for the hardening reaction, has a large specific surface area because of its high  porosity. This porosity is related to a number of important properties of the material, including the strength and permeability, which in turn affect the properties of the resulting concrete. Measurement of the specific surface area using the BET method is useful for comparing different cements. This may be performed using adsorption isotherms measured in different ways, including the adsorption of water vapour at temperatures near ambient, and adsorption of nitrogen at 77 K (the boiling point of liquid nitrogen). Different methods of measuring cement paste surface areas often give very different values, but for a single method the results are still useful for comparing different cements.

Activated carbon 
Activated carbon has strong affinity for many gases and has an adsorption cross section  of 0.162 nm2 for nitrogen adsorption at liquid-nitrogen temperature (77 K). BET theory can be applied to estimate the specific surface area of activated carbon from experimental data, demonstrating a large specific surface area, even around 3000 m2/g. However, this surface area is largely overestimated due to enhanced adsorption in micropores, and more realistic methods should be used for its estimation, such as the subtracting pore effect (SPE) method.

Catalysis
In the field of solid catalysis, the surface area of catalysts is an important factor in catalytic activity. Inorganic materials such as mesoporous silica and layered clay minerals have high surface areas of several hundred m2/g calculated by the BET method, indicating the possibility of application for efficient catalytic materials.

Specific surface area calculation
The ISO 9277 standard for calculating the specific surface area of solids is based on the BET method.

See also
 Adsorption
 Capillary condensation
 Langmuir adsorption model
 Mercury intrusion porosimetry
 Physisorption
 Surface tension

References

Scientific techniques
Physical chemistry
Gas technologies